Marchica is a Spanish-American indie rock band that formed in Pozoblanco, Spain in May 2021. Founding members include Pete Marchica (vocals, guitar and keyboards), Antonio Jesús Moreno Sanchez, Aka: El Ciento (drums and vocals), and Miguel Gomez Villar (bass). Jamie Romero Gomez (guitar) joined the band in November 2021. The band has toured mostly throughout the Andalucía region of Spain since releasing their debut studio album PED XING [pronounced: Pēd·Ching] on January 14, 2022.

History 
After a short stint living in the United Kingdom and Spain, singer/guitarist Pete Marchica met Antonio J. Moreno (illustrator and drummer of the Spanish indie rock band Algunos Hombres) outside of a bar just 2 weeks before moving back to his native Long Beach, CA in May 2017.

In the years that followed, Pete Marchica and A.J. Moreno Sanchez kept in contact via text messages and Snail-mail. During the COVID-19 pandemic of 2020, Pete Marchica began writing and recording the initial tracks for PED XING at Bennett Studios in Long Beach, CA. Upon hearing the early recordings of what would become their debut album, Antonio Jesus quickly made plans to start rehearsing for and recording for an EP which would contain songs previously written by Marchica himself. However, by June 2021, the band realized that the songs which came out of the early Escuela Taller Sessions were more than enough to produce a full-length album. The album is bookended by the title tracks, Ped Xing Pt. 1 and Ped Xing Pt. 2. Both are melodic, acoustic recordings that one journalist described as a "transatlantic pedestrian crossing littered with cheap beer, sunflower seeds, Spanish olives and psilocybin."

Recording and production 
The recording and engineering for PED XING was very much a Frankenstein project, in that pieces of tracks recorded in Long Beach, CA were spliced together with pieces recorded in Málaga, Spain and Pozoblanco. The album was mixed by both A.J. Moreno Sanchez and Pete Marchica, and eventually mastered in Berlin, Germany by famed musician and engineer Cem Oral, who in the past has worked with such artists as Nine inch Nails, Wu-Tang Clan, Black Eyed Peas, stereo Total and Gwen Stefani.

Distribution 
In the fall of 2021 the band had approached a number of record labels to sign and help with distribution, including Drag City, Matador, Sub Pop and Domino, but all declined. It wasn't only until Andalusian underground darlings Sweet Mary Records and Happy Place Records heard the unmastered cuts, when they decided to help produce a vinyl edition for release in Europe. Subsequently, Long Beach, California based label Shoreline Records also helped produce and distribute the American release of PED XING. A significant amount of money was also raised for the production from friends and family via online crowdfunding efforts.

Reception 
Marchica's music has been described as the lyrics of Jonathan Richman and Mark E. Smith, with the music of Sebadoh and Neil Young. Upon the release of PED XING, Bob Nastanovich of Pavement stated, "Marchica is a clever lot. I have faith that when they are exposed that people will dig their action.” The Spanish online music outlet Woody Jagger put PED XING on its list of two dozen records you must hear in 2022. The band also does not limit their versatility when it comes to instrumentation, as is heard on the song Crystal Seas, which features obscure percussion, keyboards, and a viola.

Additional releases 
On July 4, 2022, Marchica released a cover of the song Frontwards from Stockton, California-based indie rock band Pavement's 1992 EP titled, "Watery, Domestic". On October 6, 2022, Marchica released an original song titled "Ellie", which will appear on the forthcoming compilation record from Andalusian indie label Grabaciones Bonicas titled, Andalucía Bajo Tierra. The compilation features music from Bazofia & Miguelito García, of the band Derby Motoreta’s Burrito Kachimba, as well as other Spanish underground bands such as Elemento Deserto. The compilation was released on October 28, 2022, in a limited edition colored cassette format.

References

Lo-fi music groups
Musical groups established in 2020
Spanish indie rock groups
Andalusian music